Abdurakhman Genazovich (Ganazovich) Avtorkhanov (23 October 1908 – 24 April 1997) was a Chechen historian who worked primarily in the fields of Soviet history and History of the Communist Party of the Soviet Union (CPSU).

Biography and works

Avtorkhanov's date of birth is uncertain. According to his memoirs he was born between 1908 and 1910 in the small Chechen village of Lakha-Nevri, which was destroyed by Soviet troops during the deportation of the Chechen and Ingush population in 1944. He was given the last name of Avtorkhanov in 1923 when he was registered for an orphanage.

The young Avtorkhanov enthusiastically joined the Communist Party in 1927 and served as a high-ranking party functionary. He graduated from the elite Moscow Institute of Red Professors with a major in Russian history in 1937, during which time he wrote six books on the history of the Caucasus. He was arrested and falsely accused in 1937 during the Great Purge, but released in 1942. The NKVD assigned him to infiltrate the anti-Soviet Chechen movement in which his school friend Khasan Israilov was a leader, but Avtorkhanov crossed the front line to Germans, was arrested by Gestapo, released and lived until the end of the war in Berlin. During the war, he published in many newspapers of Nazi Germany. After the war, Avtorkhanov became a co-founder of Radio Free Europe/Radio Liberty in 1951.

Autorkhanov authored numerous books and articles on the history and core issues of Communism. His book Staline au pouvoir (The Reign of Stalin), published in French in 1951, described Joseph Stalin's reign of terror. His book Stalin and the Soviet Communist Party is regarded as a primary source for the political background of Stalin's rise to power. He was one of the first authors to claim, in his 1976 book on Stalin's death, that Stalin had been murdered by the head of NKVD Lavrentiy Beria. Pyotr Grigorenko made and distributed copies of the book in the Soviet Union by photographing and typewriting.

In his books, Avtorkhanov emphasized the leading role of Soviet security services in keeping the regime alive:

One of his books named "Murder of Chechen-Ingush nation" (in Russian: "Убийство чечено-ингушского народа") is still very popular among Chechens and Ingush today. A few months before the dissolution of the Soviet Union in 1991, Avtorkhanov was granted honorary citizenship by the Chechen-Ingush ASSR. At the time of the First Chechen War he maintained a correspondence with the Chechen president Dzhokhar Dudayev. He also urged peace negotiations on Russian President Boris Yeltsin. He died in Munich, Germany, shortly after the end of the war, in 1997.

Bibliography
Books
 
 
 
 
 
 
 
 
 
 
 
 
 

Articles

See also
 List of Eastern Bloc defectors

Notes

External links
 "Stalin and the Soviet Communist Party" online text 
 Interview with Abdurakhman Avtorkhanov 
 Biographical Entry 

20th-century births
1997 deaths
People from Chechnya
Chechen anti-communists
Historians of Chechnya
Historians of communism
Chechen people
Institute of Red Professors alumni
North Caucasian independence activists
Stalinism-era scholars and writers
Soviet defectors to the United States
Writers about the Soviet Union
Russian memoirists
20th-century American historians
American male non-fiction writers
Soviet historians
American people of Chechen descent
American political writers
20th-century memoirists
20th-century American male writers